Andrew Ezergailis (born 10 December 1930 in Rite Parish, died 22 January 2022 in Ithaca, New York) was a professor of history at Ithaca College, known for his research into the 20th-century history of Latvia, particularly of the 1917 Revolution and the Holocaust in Latvia.

In August 2007, Ezergailis was awarded the Cross of the Order of the Three Stars, one of the highest honors of Latvia, for his contributions to understanding the history of the country.
Andrew was married to Inta Ezergailis, a retired professor of German Literature at Cornell University.

Books
 2005:  Nazi/Soviet Disinformation about the Holocaust in Latvia: Daugavas Vanagi: Who are they?, 
 2002:  Stockholm Documents: The German Occupation of Latvia, 1941–1945: What Did America Know?, a collection of records of the United States Department of State, edited by A. Ezergalis
 1999: Holokausts vācu okupētajā Latvijā: 1941–1944 
 1996: The Holocaust in Latvia 1941–1944 – The Missing Center, Historical Institute of Latvia (in association with the United States Holocaust Memorial Museum) Riga 
 1983: The Latvian impact on the Bolshevik Revolution: The first phase : September 1917 to April 1918, 
 1974: The 1917 Revolution in Latvia (East European Monographs, No 8)

References

1930 births
2022 deaths
People from Viesīte Municipality
Latvian World War II refugees
Latvian emigrants to the United States
20th-century Latvian historians
21st-century American historians
American male non-fiction writers
Historians of the Holocaust
Ithaca College faculty
Academicians of the Latvian Academy of Sciences
21st-century American male writers
21st-century Latvian historians